Careys Run is a stream in the U.S. state of Ohio.

Careys Run was named after Stephen Carey, a local pioneer.

See also
List of rivers of Ohio

References

Rivers of Scioto County, Ohio
Rivers of Ohio